Jerusalem Studies in Arabic and Islam is a peer-reviewed academic journal covering the study of classical Islam, Islamic religious thought, Arabic language and literature, the origins of Islamic institutions, and the interaction between Islam and other civilizations. It is published by The Max Schloessinger Memorial Foundation at the Institute of Asian and African Studies (Hebrew University of Jerusalem). The foundation  was established from the bequest of Max and Miriam S. Schloessinger to facilitate the publication of Arabic texts as well as studies devoted to Islam, Arabic language and literature, and Middle Eastern history.

The journal was established in 1979 with M. J. Kister as founding editor-in-chief. Since 1993 the editor is Yohanan Friedmann. The journal is published annually, but occasionally two volumes are published in the same year.

References

External links

Islamic studies journals
Annual journals
Publications established in 1979
English-language journals
Arab studies
Middle Eastern studies journals
Hebrew University of Jerusalem